The 43rd Arizona State Legislature, consisting of the Arizona State Senate and the Arizona House of Representatives, was constituted in Phoenix from January 1, 1997, to December 31, 1998, during the final year of Fife Symington's second and last term as governor, and during the remainder of his term when Jane Dee Hull was appointed governor after Symington's resignation. Both the Senate and the House membership remained constant at 30 and 60, respectively. The Republicans lost a seat in the Senate, but still held a 18-12 majority. The Republicans maintained their majority in the lower chamber, remaining at 38–22.

Sessions
The Legislature met for two regular sessions at the State Capitol in Phoenix. The first opened on January 13, 1997, and adjourned on April 21, while the Second Regular Session convened on January 12, 1998, and adjourned sine die on May 22.

There were six Special Sessions, the first of which was convened on March 24, 1997, and adjourned on March 27; the second convened on November 12, 1997, and adjourned sine die on November 14; the third convened on March 11, 1998, and adjourned sine die April 8; the fourth convened on May 6, 1998, and adjourned sine die on May 14; the fifth convened on July 7, 1998, and adjourned sine die July 8; the sixth and final special session convened and adjourned on December 16, 1998.

State Senate

Members

The asterisk (*) denotes members of the previous Legislature who continued in office as members of this Legislature.

House of Representatives

Members 
The asterisk (*) denotes members of the previous Legislature who continued in office as members of this Legislature.

References

Arizona legislative sessions
1997 in Arizona
1998 in Arizona
1997 U.S. legislative sessions
1998 U.S. legislative sessions